Eucicones is a genus of cylindrical bark beetles in the family Zopheridae. There are at least two described species in Eucicones.

Species
These two species belong to the genus Eucicones:
 Eucicones marginalis (Melsheimer, 1846)
 Eucicones oblongopunctata (Wickham, 1913)

References

Further reading

 
 

Zopheridae
Articles created by Qbugbot